The Riverside Museum (formerly known as the Glasgow Museum of Transport) is a museum in Glasgow, designed by Zaha Hadid Architects, housed in a building at Pointhouse Quay in the Glasgow Harbour regeneration district of Glasgow, Scotland.  The building opened in June 2011, winning the 2013 European Museum of the Year Award. It houses many exhibits of national and international importance. The Govan-Partick Bridge will provide a pedestrian link from the museum across the Clyde to Govan. It is set to be completed in 2023.

History

1964–2011
The Museum of Transport was opened on 14 April 1964 by Queen Elizabeth The Queen Mother. Created in the wake of the closure of Glasgow's tramway system in 1962, it was initially located at the former Coplawhill tram depot on Albert Drive in Pollokshields, before moving to the Kelvin Hall in 1988. The old building was subsequently converted into the Tramway arts centre.

The museum was then situated inside the Kelvin Hall opposite the Kelvingrove Art Gallery & Museum in the west end of Glasgow. The Kelvin Hall was built in 1927, originally as an exhibition centre, but was converted in 1987 to house the Museum of Transport and the Kelvin Hall International Sports Arena.

The Kelvin Hall site itself closed in April 2010, with the Museum moving to its third home at the Riverside Museum in 2011.

2011–present
The museum at Kelvin Hall closed on 18 April 2010, with most of its collections moved to the purpose-built Riverside Museum in Glasgow Harbour on the Clyde, designed by Zaha Hadid Architects and engineers Buro Happold. The current museum opened on Tuesday 21 June 2011.

The Riverside Museum building was designed by Zaha Hadid Architects and engineers Buro Happold. The internal exhibitions and displays were designed by Event Communications, a specialist London-based museum design firm. 

The purpose-built Museum replaced the previous home for the city's transport collection, at the city's Kelvin Hall.

The location of the museum is on the site of the former A. & J. Inglis Shipyard within Glasgow Harbour, on the north bank of the River Clyde and adjacent to its confluence point with the River Kelvin. This site enabled the Clyde Maritime Trust's SV Glenlee and other visiting craft to berth alongside the museum.

Of the £74million needed for the development of the Riverside Museum, Glasgow City Council and the Heritage Lottery Fund have committed £69million. The Riverside Museum Appeal is a charitable trust established to raise the final £5million in sponsorship and donations from companies, trusts and individuals for the development of the museum. The Riverside Museum Appeal Trust is recognised as a Scottish Charity SC 033286.  Major patrons of the project include: BAE Systems Surface Ships, Weir Group, Rolls-Royce plc, FirstGroup, Strathclyde Partnership for Transport, Caledonian MacBrayne, Arnold Clark, Scottish and Southern Energy, Diageo, Bank of Scotland and Optical Express.

On 13 November 2007 the Lord Provost of Glasgow, Bob Winter cut the first turf. The main contractors for the project were BAM Construct UK Ltd with a range of trade subcontractors including the services installations being delivered by BBESL's team of Jordan Kerr, Gordon Ferguson & Jamie Will and FES, project management being the responsibility of Capita Symonds and Buro Happold providing Resident Engineering Services.  The building was completed on 20 June 2011 and the next day it opened to the public.

Collections

As well as housing many of the existing collections of the Glasgow Museum of Transport, the city has acquired SAR Class 15F 4-8-2 steam locomotive, No.3007. Built by the Glasgow-based North British Locomotive Company at its Polmadie Works in 1945, the locomotive was bought in late 2006 from Transnet. It was on display in George Square for a short time in 2007, as part of the effort to raise the £5 million public contribution funding.

Road vehicles
The museum housed the oldest surviving pedal cycle and the world's leading collection of Scottish-built cars and trucks, including pioneering examples from Scottish manufacturers Argyll, Arrol-Johnston and Albion. More modern Scottish-built cars, namely the Rootes Group's Hillman Imp, Chrysler Avenger and Chrysler Sunbeam were represented too along with many other motorcars in a large showroom-type display sponsored by Arnold Clark.

All forms of transport were featured, from horse-drawn vehicles to fire engines, from motorcycles to caravans, even toy cars and prams.

Ship models
In the Clyde Room was a display of some 250 ship models, representing the contribution of the River Clyde and its shipbuilders and engineers to maritime trade and the Royal Navy, including the Comet of 1812, the Hood, the Howe, the Queen Mary, and the Queen Elizabeth and the QE2.

Railway and municipal transport exhibits
Locomotive manufacture was also an important Glasgow industry and the museum celebrated the city's railway heritage, including locomotives such as:

 The Caledonian Railway - Caley No. 123 single driver
 Highland Railway -  No. 103, the Jones Goods
 Great North of Scotland Railway - Gordon Highlander No. 49 (On loan to the Scottish Railway Preservation Society)
 North British Railway - 256 "Glen Douglas" (on loan from the Scottish Railway Preservation Society).
 Glasgow & South Western Railway - 5 Class 0-6-0T no. 9
 Andrew Barclay 0-6-0 Fireless locomotive, South of Scotland Electricity Board, No. 1
 First ScotRail - Class 380 EMU (full-scale model)

Other main exhibits displayed the evolution of Glasgow's public transport system and included seven Glasgow Corporation Tramways tramcars from different eras, Glasgow Corporation trolleybuses, and the reconstruction of "Kelvin Street", which aimed to recapture the atmosphere of 1930s Glasgow, including full-scale replicas of a pre-1977 Glasgow Subway station and the Regal Cinema, which played Scottish transport documentaries such as Seawards the Great Ships.

See also
Culture in Glasgow
Scottish Tramway and Transport Society
Glasgow Corporation Tramways – history of trams in Glasgow
A. & J. Inglis shipyard at Pointhouse Quay, where more than 500 ships have been built
Titan Clydebank
Scottish Maritime Museum
Summerlee, Museum of Scottish Industrial Life
 List of transport museums (worldwide)
 Scottish Tramway and Transport Society
 Summerlee, Museum of Scottish Industrial Life

External links

 
 Riverside Museum - new home for Museum of Transport

References

2011 establishments in Scotland
Cultural infrastructure completed in 2011
Museums established in 2011
Museums in Glasgow
Transport museums in Scotland
Zaha Hadid buildings
Neo-futurism architecture
Partick
Culture in Glasgow
1964 establishments in Scotland
Museums established in 1964
Pollokshields